Seeing Things is the ninth poetry collection by Seamus Heaney, who received the 1995 Nobel Prize in Literature. It was published in 1991. Heaney draws inspiration from the visions of afterlife in Virgil and Dante Alighieri in order to come to terms with the death of his father, Patrick, in 1986. The title, Seeing Things, refers both to the solid, fluctuating world of objects and to a haunted, hallucinatory realm of the imagination. Heaney has been recorded reading this collection on the Seamus Heaney Collected Poems album.

 The Golden Bough

PART I
 
 The Journey Back
 Markings
 Three Drawings 1. The Point
 Three Drawings 2. The Pulse
 Three Drawings 3. A Haul
 Casting and Gathering
 Man and Boy
 Seeing Things I
 Seeing Things II
 Seeing Things III
 The Ash Plant
 1.1.87
 An August Night
 Field of Vision
 The Pitchfork
 A Basket of Chestnuts
 The Biretta
 The Settle Bed
 The Schoolbag
 Glanmore Revisited 1. Scrabble
 Glanmore Revisited 2. The Cot
 Glanmore Revisited 3. Scene Shifts
 Glanmore Revisited 4. 1973
 Glanmore Revisited 5. Lustral Sonnet
 Glanmore Revisited 6. Bedside Reading
 Glanmore Revisited 7. The Skylight
 A Pillowed Head
 A Royal Prospect
 A Retrospect
 The Rescue
 Wheels within Wheels
 The Sounds of Rain
 Fosterling

 
PART II - SQUARINGS
 
1: Lightenings
 
 Lightenings i
 Lightenings ii
 Lightenings iii
 Lightenings iv
 Lightenings v
 Lightenings vi
 Lightenings vii
 Lightenings viii
 Lightenings ix
 Lightenings x
 Lightenings xi
 Lightenings xii

2: Settings
 
 Settings xiii
 Settings xiv
 Settings xv
 Settings xvi
 Settings xvii
 Settings xviii
 Settings xix
 Settings xx
 Settings xxi
 Settings xxii
 Settings xxiii
 Settings xxiv

3: Crossings
 
 Crossings xxv
 Crossings xxvi
 Crossings xxvii
 Crossings xxviii
 Crossings xxix
 Crossings xxx
 Crossings xxxi
 Crossings xxxii
 Crossings xxxiii
 Crossings xxxiv
 Crossings xxxv
 Crossings xxxvi

4. Squarings
 
 Squarings xxxvii 
 Squarings xxxviii 
 Squarings xxxix 
 Squarings xl 
 Squarings xli 
 Squarings xlii 
 Squarings xliii 
 Squarings xliv 
 Squarings xlv 
 Squarings xlvi 
 Squarings xlvii 
 Squarings xlviii 
 The Crossing

References

1991 poetry books
Irish poetry collections
Poetry by Seamus Heaney
Faber and Faber books